Toto (Bengali: ,) is a Sino-Tibetan language spoken on the border of India and Bhutan, by the tribal Toto people in Totopara, West Bengal along the border with Bhutan. It is also spoken in Subhapara, Dhunchipara, and Panchayatpara hillocks on India-Bhutan border in Jalpaiguri district, West Bengal (Ethnologue).

Status
Toto is listed as a critically endangered language by UNESCO, with perhaps 1,000 speakers. However, most families in the community speak Toto at home. Most children learn Toto at home, although they use Bengali in school.

Anthropological Survey of India (AnSI) set out to conduct a study on language of the Toto tribe, whose population has dwindled to 1,536, they did not realize that the language is more endangered than the tribe itself. Researchers as well the members of the Toto community admit that the language is under threat and the influence of other languages, particularly Nepali and Bengali, is increasing day by day.

The Himalayan Languages Project is working on the first grammatical sketch of Toto.

Phonology

Vowels 
Toto consists of 25 segmental phonemes, of which 19 are consonants and six are vowels. The phonemes of this language are as follows:

Vowels: there are six vowel phonemes in the Toto language. They can be classified horizontally into three as front unrounded, central unrounded and back rounded vowels and vertically as close, close-mid, open-mid and open.

The following minimal pairs establish the phonetics status of the vowel:

/i/~/u/

/Jiya/		'rat'

/Juya/		'bird'

/i/~/e/

/iŋ/		'brother in-law'

/eŋ/		'ginger'

/ciwa/		'tear'

/cewa/		'cut' (cloth)

/i/~/a/

/guJi/		'owl'

/guJa/		'pocket'

/nico/		'fire'	

/naco/		'two'

/e/~/o/

/je/		'grass'

/jo/		'breast'

/e/~/a/

/lepa/		'brain'

/lapa/		'jungle betel leaf'

/kewa/		'birth'

/kawa/		'sound'

There are eight diphthongs realized in Toto. These are /ei/, /ai/, /oi/, /ui/, /əi/, /eu/, /au/ and /ou/. Diphthong /ui/ occurs in all positions, /eu/ occurs initial and medial positions, /ai/, /oi/, /əi/, and /ei/ occur medial and final positions. While /ou/ and /au/ occur only in the medial positions.
Furthermore, with regard to consonants, Toto has an inventory of ten obstruents, eight of which are contrastive in voicing.  Toto also distinguishes the voiceless obstruents /t/ and /p/ with its aspirated equivalents /tʰ/ and /pʰ/, respectively.

Consonants

Vocabulary
Below are some Toto words from van Driem (1995), who uses these words to suggest that Toto may be a Sal language.

 'to drink'
 'shoulder'
 'cooking pot' (second syllable), cf. Dzongkha  'jug'
 'seed'
 'today'
 'moon'
 'fall' (cf. Benedict's PTB  'dive, sink, drown')
 'big' (first syllable)
 'shit'
 'right' (vs. 'left')
 'stomach' (first syllable); the second syllable  is cognate with Toto  'meat'
 'meat'
 'bamboo species' (first syllable), Nepali 
 'paddy'
 'wing'
 'sun'
 'stand'
 'yesterday'
 'navel'
 'bring'
 'to shit'
 'sleep'
 'urine'
 'dog'
 'name'
 'horn'
 'flower'
 'snake'
 'stone'
 'tongue'
 'to dream'
 'ear'
 'eye'
 'fish'
 'body hair'
 'I'
 'sole of the foot'
 'pig'
 'thou'
 'tooth'
 'die'
 'eat'
 'be sweet, taste sweet'
 'mango'
 'jackfruit'
 'kill'
 'dig'
 'egg'
 'sit, stay'
 'water'
 'tear'
 'spit'
 'rain'
 'blood'
 'milk'
 'buffalo'
 'come down, descend'
 'neck'
 'weave'
 'cry'
 'monkey'
 'mouse, rat'

Pronouns
The Toto personal pronouns are (van Driem 1995):

Numerals
The Toto numerals are (van Driem 1995):

Writing system

An alphabetic script developed for the language by community elder and author, Dhaniram Toto, was published in 2015, and has seen limited but increasing use in literature, education, and computing; most significantly, the Toto alphabet was added to the Unicode Standard in September, 2021. Prior to the publication of this script, Dhaniram Toto and other members of the community (whose literacy rate as per sample survey carried out in 2003 was just 33.64 per cent) penned books and poems in the Bengali script.

Unicode

The Toto alphabet was added to the Unicode Standard in September, 2021 with the release of version 14.0.

The Unicode block for Toto is U+1E290–U+1E2BF:

See also
Dhimalish comparative vocabulary list (Wiktionary)

Notes

References

Amitabha, S. (1993). Toto, Society and Change: A Sub-Himalayan Tribe of West Bengal. Firma KLM.
Basumatary, C. (2014). The Phonological Study of Toto Language. Language in India, 14:6, 59–84. Retrieved February 9, 2015, from http://languageinindia.com/june2014/chibiramtotophonology1.pdf
Chaudhuri, B. (1992). Tribal Transformation in India. New Delhi, India: Inter-India Publications.
Doherty, B. (2012, April 29). India's Tribal People Fast Becoming Lost for Words. Retrieved February 8, 2015, from http://www.smh.com.au/world/indias-tribal-people-fast-becoming-lost-for-words-20120429-1xted.html

Mehrotra, R. (1974). Endangered Languages in India. International Journal of the Sociology of Language, 105–114. Retrieved February 9, 2015, from https://web.archive.org/web/20111016074549/http://www.degruyter.de/journals/ijsl/detailEn.cfm
Perumalsamy P (2016) Toto Language LSI West Bengal Vol.I in the website of Office of the Registrar General India, New Delhi http://www.censusindia.gov.in/2011-documents/lsi/lsi_wb/5TOTO.pdf
Singh, S. (2014, August 1). Toto Language More Endangered Than Tribe. Retrieved February 8, 2015, from http://www.thehindu.com/news/cities/kolkata/toto-language-more-endangered-than-tribe/article6270931.ece
van Driem, G., & Bronkhorst, J. (2001). Languages of the Himalayas: An Ethnolinguistic Handbook of the  Greater Himalayan Region Containing an Introduction to the Symbiotic Theory of Language (pp. 559–760). Leiden, Netherlands: Brill Academic Pub.
van Driem, G. (2007). South Asia and Middle East. In C. Moseley (Ed.), Encyclopedia of the World's Endangered Languages (pp. 289–348). London and New York: Routledge.
van Driem, George. 1995. The Ṭoṭo language of the Bhutanese duars. Paper presented at ICSTLL 28.

External links
India's Tribal People Fast Becoming Lost for Words
About Toto People
Atlas of the World's Languages in Danger
World Oral Literature Project
Ethnologue: Languages of the World, 16th Edition (2009)
[http://www.censusindia.gov.in/2011-documents/lsi/lsi_wb/5TOTO.pdf

Kiranti languages
Languages of India
Languages of Bhutan
Endangered languages of India